Mount Cook Village, officially Aoraki / Mount Cook, is located within New Zealand's Aoraki / Mount Cook National Park at the end of , only  south of the summit of the country's highest mountain, also called Aoraki / Mount Cook, in the Southern Alps.

Being situated inside a National Park, it is not possible to own property in Mount Cook Village; however, because of the year-round operation of the hotel and motels, the village has a small permanent population of around 250.  

All buildings and facilities operate on concessions and leases from the government. The village has no grocery stores apart from a small in-hotel convenience store. There is a self-service petrol pump behind the hotel complex; however, the fuel price reflects the remote location.

Mount Cook Village operates a small school with a roll as low as a dozen children, the only school in New Zealand inside a national park.

History
The first building at the location of Mount Cook Village was the second Hermitage hotel, built in 1913 and opened in 1914; however, that building burned to the ground in 1957 and was replaced in 1958 by what later became the current hotel.

The 1960s and 1970s saw significant extensions to the hotel and Mount Cook Village, including water mains, sewerage treatment, local streets, and the sealing of State Highway 80, which greatly improved access. A local fire brigade was established in 1976.

The official name of the settlement was amended to a dual name, Aoraki / Mount Cook, by the Ngāi Tahu Claims Settlement Act 1998.

Demographics
It is part of the Mackenzie Lakes statistical area. 

Mt Cook Village had a population of 213 at the 2018 New Zealand census, an increase of 12 people (6.0%) since the 2013 census, and an increase of 3 people (1.4%) since the 2006 census. There were 27 households. There were 99 males and 114 females, giving a sex ratio of 0.87 males per female. The median age was 29.5 years (compared with 37.4 years nationally), with 24 people (11.3%) aged under 15 years, 87 (40.8%) aged 15 to 29, 93 (43.7%) aged 30 to 64, and 6 (2.8%) aged 65 or older.

Ethnicities were 53.5% European/Pākehā, 2.8% Māori, 8.5% Pacific peoples, 25.4% Asian, and 14.1% other ethnicities (totals add to more than 100% since people could identify with multiple ethnicities).

Although some people objected to giving their religion, 52.1% had no religion, 28.2% were Christian, 1.4% were Hindu, 1.4% were Muslim, 9.9% were Buddhist and 1.4% had other religions.

Of those at least 15 years old, 45 (23.8%) people had a bachelor or higher degree, and 12 (6.3%) people had no formal qualifications. The median income was $35,200, compared with $31,800 nationally. The employment status of those at least 15 was that 177 (93.7%) people were employed full-time, and 9 (4.8%) were part-time.

Tourism
Mount Cook Village caters to a steady flow of around 250,000 visitors per year with a wide range of facilities and accommodation.

An international style hotel, The Hermitage,  the name of which dates back to the original hotel built in 1884, is the only prominent larger building in the village and a popular location, especially for international tourists. The Hermitage is sometimes used as an alternative name for the settlement.  The hotel also owns and operates chalets and a lodge & motel with options ranging from backpacker accommodation through to family units.

There are two more motels in the village, and a total of four restaurants or pubs, two of which are inside the main hotel complex.  The buildings and motel units are connected via paved footpaths.
The small White Horse Hill camping ground is located about  outside the village, connected via a walking track.

Commercial operations run guided walks, 4WD safaris, boating on the Tasman glacier lake, horse treks, fishing, and scenic flights including landing on the glaciers.  These are based at the hotel, departing and returning to the hotel's main entrance.

A number of nearby walks and climbs ranging from 10 minute bush walks to multi-day tramping tracks and routes can be explored from Mount Cook Village.

There are three short walking tracks through forest areas within the village and on its outskirts, as well as the starting points of longer walking tracks ranging from the popular and easy Hooker Valley Track to more strenuous walks such as the steep track to Sealy Tarns.

The village is home to the park's visitor centre, and the starting point for climbers, hunters and trampers visiting the many huts.

The YHA backpacker hostel is due to close permanently in December 2021 due to the ongoing Covid-19 pandemic.

Climate
Mount Cook Village has an oceanic climate (Cfb). Summers are mild with cool nights while winters are chilly with nightly lows below freezing. Precipitation is extremely heavy year round.

Education 
Aoraki Mount Cook School is a full primary school serving years 1 to 8, with a roll of  students as of  The school opened in 1959.

Notes

References

External links

 Mount Cook Village

Mackenzie District
Populated places in Canterbury, New Zealand
Tourist attractions in Canterbury, New Zealand
Aoraki / Mount Cook National Park